Plasmodium japonicum is a parasite of the genus Plasmodium.

Like all Plasmodium species P. japonicum has both vertebrate and insect hosts. The vertebrate hosts for this parasite are birds.

Description 
The parasite was first described by Manwell in 1966.

References 

japonicum